Toussiana is a department or commune of Houet Province in south-western Burkina Faso. Its capital lies at the town of Toussiana.

Towns and villages

References

Departments of Burkina Faso
Houet Province